Erbessa thiaucourti is a moth of the family Notodontidae first described by James S. Miller in 2008. It is found in French Guiana.

The length of the forewings is 14.5–16 mm for males and 19 mm for females. The ground color of the forewings is blackish brown with a violet iridescence. The basal three-quarters of the hindwings are blackish brown with a turquoise to cobalt-blue iridescence, while the distal fourth is blackish brown with a violet iridescence.

Etymology
This species is named in honor of Paul Thiaucourt, an expert on Notodontidae.

References

Moths described in 2008
Notodontidae of South America